The 2019–20 Welsh Alliance League, known as the Lock Stock Welsh Alliance League for sponsorship reasons, was the 36th, and final season of the Welsh Alliance League, which consisted of two divisions: the third and fourth levels of the Welsh football pyramid.

There are sixteen teams in Division 1 and fifteen teams in Division 2, with the champions of Division 1 promoted to the Cymru North and the bottom two relegated to Division 2. In Division 2, the champions and the top two runners-up will be promoted to the newly formed FAW League One.

The season commenced on 9 August 2019.

Division 1

Teams
Llangefni Town were champions in the previous season and were promoted to the newly formed Cymru North. They were replaced by Denbigh Town and Holyhead Hotspur who were both relegated from the now defunct Cymru Alliance.

The bottom two teams from the previous season, Barmouth & Dyffryn United and Llandudno Junction, were relegated to Division 2 for 2019–20. In Division 2 champions, Glan Conwy and runners-up, Blaenau Ffestiniog Amateur were promoted in their place.

Grounds and locations

League table

Results

Team form

Division 2

Teams
Glan Conwy were champions in the previous season and were promoted to Division 1 along with runners-up, Blaenau Ffestiniog Amateur. They were replaced by Barmouth & Dyffryn United and Llandudno Junction who were both relegated from Division 1.

The bottom team from the previous season was Amlwch Town, who avoided relegation as Meliden resigned from the Welsh Alliance League at the end of the season.

Gwynedd League runners-up, Gwalchmai and Vale of Clwyd and Conwy Football League Premier Division champions, Llandudno Amateurs were promoted to Welsh Alliance League Division 2.

On 21 July 2019, Llannerch-y-medd resigned from the Welsh Alliance League after losing the entire squad of players from the previous season for various reasons. They will now play in the Gwynedd League for the 2019–20 season.

Grounds and locations

League table

Results

Team form

References

Welsh Alliance League seasons
2019–20 in Welsh football